Palmela is a town and a municipality in Portugal. The population in 2011 was 62,831, in an area of 465.12 km².

The municipal holiday is 1 June.

Parishes
Administratively, the municipality is divided into 4 civil parishes (freguesias):
 Palmela
 Pinhal Novo
 Poceirão e Marateca
 Quinta do Anjo

General information

The area has been settled since at least Neolithic times, as evidenced by excavations at places such as the artificial caves of Casal do Pardo and the Castro of Chibanes. The town's name comes from its Roman founder, Cornelius Palma (Palmella). Palmela, once a fortress, was conquered by the Portuguese in the 12th century. A semi-rural town, it is located up a hill in the Arrábida area, within Portugal's largest urban area. Many people are moving in from big cities like Lisbon. Wild fires in the region are a threat to the environment.

The castle, Castelo de Palmela, offers a unique over the whole region of the Setúbal Peninsula, Lisbon, and the Atlantic Coast. It was a strategic place in past centuries, and today it is still a main juncture of Portugal's road and rail networks.

Palmela is home to many multinational industrial units like Volkswagen and Coca-Cola, and a significant number of foreign families live in the area. The local radio often broadcasts in Ukrainian.

Palmela's traditional products are its wine, which has achieved international awards in several festivals like that of Bordeaux, and the Queijo de Azeitão (Azeitão cheese). There are several festivals dedicated to these products, the most famous being the Festa das Vindimas (Harvest' Festival) and the Festival do Queijo, Pão e Vinho (Festival of Cheese, Bread and Wine).

Palmela is the birthplace of the Portuguese explorer Hermenegildo Capelo. Some other famous individuals such as Hans Christian Andersen were briefly hosted there.

Economy
The municipality is famous for its production of fruit and wine.

In the 1990s, the joint-venture Volkswagen-Ford AutoEuropa vehicle production plant opened, to produce the Mk1 MPV sold under three marques: Volkswagen Sharan, SEAT Alhambra and Ford Galaxy. After Ford left the joint venture, the plant has since continued to produce the Volkswagen and SEAT products, and added the Volkswagen Eos, Volkswagen Scirocco and Volkswagen T-Roc.

Notable people 
 Hermenegildo Capelo (1841 in Palmela - 1917) an officer in the Portuguese Navy and an explorer, charted territory between Angola and Mozambique
 Hugo José Jorge O'Neill (1874 – 1940 in Palmela) the head of the Clanaboy O'Neill dynasty
 Octávio Machado (born 1949) a retired footballer and coach with 307 club caps and 19 for Portugal
 Ricardo Pateiro (born 1980 in Palmela) a Portuguese retired footballer with 270 club caps

See also
Palmela IPR

References

External links

Town Hall official website
GIS official website
Photos from Palmela

Populated places in Setúbal District
Municipalities of Setúbal District
Towns in Portugal